Donacoscaptes cynedradellus is a moth in the family Crambidae. It was described by Schaus in 1922. It is found in Brazil (Parana).

References

Haimbachiini
Moths described in 1922